Richard Reid Fliehr (February 26, 1988 March 29, 2013), better known by his ring name Reid Flair, was an American professional wrestler. He was the younger son of retired professional wrestler Ric Flair, the younger half-brother of wrestler David Flair and the younger brother of wrestler Charlotte Flair. He was best known for his appearances alongside his father in World Championship Wrestling and for his appearances with All Japan Pro Wrestling.

Amateur wrestling career 
Flair attended Providence High School in Charlotte, North Carolina and Blair Academy in Blairstown, New Jersey, and was an accomplished amateur wrestler achieving numerous awards. During a tournament, Flair attacked another competitor after he taunted Fliehr by mocking his father. In April 1998, Fliehr won the AAU National Wrestling Tournament.

Professional wrestling career

World Championship Wrestling (1998, 2000)
Fliehr wrestled two matches in the now defunct World Championship Wrestling (WCW). In the first, on October 4, 1998, he was ten years old when he defeated Eric Bischoff and on June 12, 2000, he teamed with his father Ric in a loss to David Flair and Vince Russo in a tag team match.

Independent circuit (2008–2012) 

Fliehr made an appearance on March 29, 2008 during the WWE Hall of Fame. The next night, he made his first WrestleMania appearance with his family representing Ric Flair in the Hall of Fame. He also sat at ringside during the WrestleMania XXIV event. He appeared on Raw the following night with his family to honor his father's career. Throughout 2008, Flair was trained by Harley Race. Flair made his debut on December 6, 2008, under the name "Reid Flair", teaming with his elder brother David to defeat The Nasty Boys in Charlotte, North Carolina, with Hulk Hogan as the special guest referee. He wrestled for many independent promotions such as Big Time Wrestling and Northeast Wrestling.

On April 11, 2009, Flair, his brother David, and Brad Anderson beat Jeff Lewis, C. W. Anderson and Masked Superstar at an NWA Charlotte show. The match ended controversially with a double pin, when Flair pinned Lewis while CW Anderson pinned Brad Anderson. At the end of the match, Flair was awarded the NWA Mid-Atlantic Heritage Championship belt. At NWA Charlotte's next show on May 25, however, Lewis was announced as the NWA Mid-Atlantic Heritage Champion, with no explanation given. On May 2, he and David took on Buff Bagwell and Rikki Nelson and would lose. In June 2010, Reid teamed up with George South Jr. to take part in The Anderson Brothers Classic 4 Tournament where they defeated Caleb Konley and Cedric Alexander in the semi finals and Charlie Dreamer and Jake Manning in the final. In August he made his debut for Lucha Libre USA. 

In the same month next year he participated in NWA Future Legends Tournament and lost to John Skyler in the semi-final.

All Japan Pro Wrestling (2013) 
In late 2012, it was reported that Flair had started training with All Japan Pro Wrestling. Flair made his in-ring debut for All Japan on January 26, 2013, when he replaced his sick father in a tag team match, where he and Keiji Mutoh were defeated by Seiya Sanada and Tatsumi Fujinami, with Sanada submitting him for the win. During February, Flair worked All Japan's Excite Series tour, wrestling undercard tag team matches. On March 15, Flair wrestled his first singles match in All Japan, submitting Yasufumi Nakanoue with the figure-four leglock. Flair returned to the United States following All Japan's March 17 event, which was 12 days before his death.

Personal life 
Fliehr was born in Charlotte, North Carolina, to professional wrestler Ric Flair and Elizabeth Fliehr. He was the youngest of two siblings; he has a half-sister, Megan, a half-brother, David, and  sister, Ashley.
Fliehr attended and graduated from Providence High School in 2006. His favorite band was Guns N' Roses.

Fliehr was arrested on June 23, 2007, for assault and battery, and was released after posting bail. On March 4, 2009, Fliehr was arrested for driving while impaired in Mecklenburg County, North Carolina, and was released after posting $1000 in bail. Fliehr was arrested again on April 26, 2009. After crashing his car, police found black tar heroin inside it, and he faced felony charges. He was also charged with driving while impaired, driving with a revoked license, and possession of drug paraphernalia, and was released after posting $15,000 in bail. He later overdosed twice in 2011.

During the Ric Flair 30 for 30 special, Triple H revealed that Fliehr wanted to sign a developmental contract with WWE but failed two drug tests, the second one being announced and actually worse than the first test. Ric, in denial of his son's problems, told Triple H that he thought that Fliehr had gotten a "supplement from GNC" instead of being honest with himself of Fliehr's real problems. Ric later admitted during the 30 for 30 special that he felt that he may have been a best friend to Reid at times when Reid would have been better served with Ric acting as his father.

Death 
On March 29, 2013, Flair was found dead in bed at a Residence Inn in the SouthPark neighborhood of Charlotte, North Carolina. He was 25 years old. On June 14, 2013, Flair's autopsy revealed that it was drug overdose of heroin and traces of two prescription tranquilizers, clonazepam, and alprazolam, which contributed to his death.

On November 16, 2015, six days before Survivor Series, Reid's sister WWE Divas Champion Charlotte signed a contract to face Paige at the event. Charlotte proclaimed she was doing this for Reid as a tribute to him. Paige then mocked her by saying that "Your little baby brother, he didn't have much fight in him, did he?"  It was later rumoured that WWE had not asked for permission from the Flair family to reference Reid's death, and had given no prior warning to his parents, although this has been disputed by several people within WWE. The angle was voted by Wrestling Observer Newsletter readers as the Most Disgusting Promotional Tactic of 2015.

Championships and accomplishments 
Mid Atlantic Championship Wrestling
NWA Mid-Atlantic Tag Team Championship (1 time) – with David Flair 
National Wrestling Alliance
The Anderson Brothers Classic 4 Tournament – with George South Jr.
NWA Charlotte
NWA Mid-Atlantic Heritage Championship (1 time)
Xtreme World Wrestling
XWW United States Heavyweight Championship (2 times)
At the conclusion of a match on April 11, 2009, Flair was handed the championship. At the following show, the former champion Jeff Lewis was announced as the current champion, with no explanation given.

Filmography 
 The Dooley and Pals Show

See also
 List of premature professional wrestling deaths

References

External links 

 All Japan Pro Wrestling profile
 
 

1988 births
2013 deaths
American male professional wrestlers
Anderson family
Professional wrestlers from North Carolina
Sportspeople from Charlotte, North Carolina
20th-century professional wrestlers
21st-century professional wrestlers